Stephanie Schneider (born 25 September 1990) is a German bobsledder who has competed since 2008. Her best World Cup finish was first in the two-woman events at Whistler in November  and Lake Placid in December 2010.

She won gold at the 2011 FIBT World Championships in Königssee  in the mixed team events.

World Cup results
All results are sourced from the International Bobsleigh and Skeleton Federation (IBSF).

References

External links

Stephanie Schneider at the German Bobsleigh, Luge, and Skeleton Federation 

1990 births
Living people
German female bobsledders
Bobsledders at the 2014 Winter Olympics
Bobsledders at the 2018 Winter Olympics
Olympic bobsledders of Germany
21st-century German women